Azonexus is a genus of gram-negative, non-spore-forming, highly motile bacteria that is the type genus of the family Azonexaceae which is in the order Rhodocyclales of the class Betaproteobacteria.

References

Bacteria genera
Azonexaceae
Rhodocyclales
Betaproteobacteria